Kristen Fløgstad (born 11 April 1947) is a former Norwegian athlete from Søgne in Vest-Agder. He represented Kristiansands IF.

He won the national championships in triple jump ten times (1968, 1970–71, 1973–76, 1979–80 and 1982) and in long jump six times (1967–68, 1973 and 1975–77), being awarded the King's Cup (kongepokal) once. His personal best result in long jump, 8.02 metres achieved on Bislett stadion on 4 August 1973, is still the Norwegian record. 

Fløgstad competed at the 1972 Summer Olympics, finishing 8th in the triple jump contest. 

1947 births
Living people
People from Søgne
Norwegian male triple jumpers
Norwegian male long jumpers
Athletes (track and field) at the 1972 Summer Olympics
Olympic athletes of Norway
20th-century Norwegian people